Zbijewo-Parcele A is a settlement in the administrative district of Gmina Przedecz, within Koło County, Greater Poland Voivodeship, in west-central Poland.

References

Zbijewo-Parcele A